Catacamas is a city, with a population of 59,990 (2020 calculation), and a municipality in the Olancho Department of Honduras.

It is the largest municipality in Central America in terms of area.

Overview

Catacamas, called the Florida City by the great poet and writer Froylán Turcios, extends over a vast plain irrigated by the Rio Guayape in the heart of the luxuriant department of Olancho.

The city is situated 210 km. north-east of the Honduran capital, Tegucigalpa, and is easily accessible by paved road. Catacamas has historically been characterised by the hospitality, resilience, and progressive spirit of its people, as well as its rich natural setting, which is suitable for both agricultural and forest production.

It is located in a valley 450 meters above sea level. The North White Stone Mountain, part of Agalta Mountains National Park, is located near the city, which is home to a variety of botanical species such as conifers, broadleaf plants, and some 80 varieties of orchids, as well as a rich fauna, including wild cats and the quetzal.

To the north and west are the mountains "Cerro de la Cruz" and the hill "El Cuartel", among others, where you achieve the best panoramic views of the city, including the sports centre and cultural park "Ramón Díaz López".

Approximately five km to the east of Catacamas, one can find the world-famous Talgua Caves (Cuevas de Talgua) discovered in 1935. A recent discovery in the caves is that of the "Glowing Skulls," Pech Indian skeletons from approximately three thousand years ago.

About 6 km to the south of Catacamas runs the Guayape gold, which forms the river Guayambre Patuca, the second longest river in Honduras, after the Segovia. Between the two rivers stretches the Cordillera Entre Ríos, which is part of the Municipality of Catacamas.

Catacamas and Olancho have many characteristics in common: they are the municipality and the largest department of Honduras. Catacamas’ area is 7228.5 square kilometres.

The city of Catacamas is located at 14°54'04" north latitude and 85°, 55', 31", Meridian Greenwich. Gualaco lies to the north, San Esteban and Dulce Nombre de Culmí to the south with Patuca and Las Trojes, to the east, Dulce Nombre de Culmí and the department of Jinotega, Nicaragua, and west to Santa María del Real, San Francisco de Becerra and Juticalpa. The Talgua River runs to the east of the town, before joining the Guayape.

The Catholic Church "San Francisco de Asis" is one of the main focal points in the town, and stands across from the municipal building. At the centre of Catacamas city is the Parque Central, a focal point of town life.

Villages within Catacamas municipality include El Esquilinchuche on the banks of the Guayape river.

Demographics
At the time of the 2013 Honduras census, Catacamas municipality had a population of 117,493. Of these, 94.73% were Mestizo, 3.94% White, 0.69% Black or Afro-Honduran, 0.47% Indigenous and 0.17% others.

Gallery

Climate
Catacamas has a Tropical wet and dry climate under the Köppen climate classification.

Infrastructure
In the recent years Catacamas has changed its appearance regarding street paving the urban area. A lot of streets were paved, and there are plans to continue the paving of new streets and boulevards.

Rural roads have been paved so that the mobilisation of products has become much more comfortable, for example, the route between the municipalities of Dulce Nombre de Culmí and Catacamas. This drive now only takes 45 minutes in a private vehicle.

Road and aerial infrastructure

The highway to the capital is paved the entire way with a lot of pot-holes (Catacamas – Tegucigalpa 210 km; approx. 4 hours ride) which connects to Sand Pedro Sula (Catacamas – SPS 545 km) and to the north coast.  The road to Dulce Nombre de Culmi (Catacamas – Culmi 40 km) is dirt but is passable year round. As of 2019 the road is paved all the way to Culmí, but littered with substantial potholes.
 In June 2011 a new airport should be opened in Aguacate, some kilometres in direction to Culmí.

Water and sanitation

Two oxidation ponds in use with one more in the planning stages.  Dump where solid waste is burned.  Solid waste burial dump in planning.  Water sanitation plant that is not in use.

Communication

Telephone: Fixed telephone service provided by Hondutel; four cellular providers: Tigo, Claro, Digicel, Olanchocel.
Television: Two cable television providers: Telecab and Cavicab; 5 local television stations: canal 30, canal 9, canal 21, canal 33, canal 40.
Radio: 15 local radio stations and 1 national station (radio América).

Energy

An electric substation is under construction that will considerably better the energy service which is currently lacking due to increasing demand.

Health

 Catacamas is served by several health centres. One clinic is in a barrio of Catacamas, and five are in the Sector Three mountain area east of Catacamas. The mountain clinics are operated in conjunction with the Honduran Secretary of Health. 
A public health centre offers maternity services.

Ward and emergency services

A private, Catholic hospital is currently under construction.
A public hospital is being solicited.

University

The Universidad Nacional de Agricultura UNA (National Agriculture University) is also located in Catcamas.

Sports
The local football club is Atlético Olanchano, who play at the Estadio Rubén Guifarro. They have had a few seasons in the top tier of Honduran football but currently play in the Honduran second division.

Economy

Catacamas is a town rich in dairy, meat and basic grains. Of the three sectors of the municipality: Primary (Agriculture, Livestock), Secondary (Industry) and Tertiary (Services and Trade), the last produces 45 percent of the gross value of production (GVP).

But the town is still dominated by its productive rural areas. The growing productive sub-sector has a gross production value of over 1.9 billion Lempiras annually. The main agricultural products include beans and corn as well as coffee and cassava. The main industrial products are the production of milk, sand blocks, sewing and breads. (Data source: PDEM Catacamas, 2007 y Base de Datos del Dpto. Control Tributario Municipalidad de Catacamas 2009).

(1)The construction sector, for example, has been strengthened with new projects of subdivision/development. Many of the houses and land are bought by originating Catacamans living abroad or through their relatives.

(2) Another growth area is tourism. Recently, a public private table implemented activities that strengthen this sector according to a common strategy of the municipalities Santa María del Real and Dulce Nombre de Culmí, supported by the German Cooperation. Currently, we are working on the design of eco-tourism routes and in training for service providers (tour guides, restaurants, hotels, etc.).

(3) Another innovative process is the certification of several coffee farms in the region with the Rainforest Alliance Certificate which is a certificate for sustainable coffee production. The certification can achieve better prices for coffee while preserving the environment. Portal Virtual de Negocios

Talgua caves

Among the area's most famous tourist attractions are the Talgua caves, also known as "The Cave of the Glowing Skulls," is located a couple miles north-east of Catacamas.  The caves were used as a burial site by the native peoples, and over time, the bones left there were covered by the calcite dripping from the ceiling Radiocarbon testing indicated that the burials were made around 900 B.C., well before the rise of the Maya and other civilizations. The ossuary chamber was discovered in 1994 by a Peace Corps Volunteer named Timothy Berg, along with two Catacamas locals named Desiderio Reyes and Jorge Yánez, and research is still being conducted in the area.

See also

References

External links

 http://www.calstatela.edu/academic/anthro/harvest.htm

Municipalities of the Olancho Department